The Keystone–Loening K-84 Commuter was a single-engine closed-cabin 4-place biplane amphibious flying boat built by Keystone–Loening. It was powered by a 300 hp Wright Whirlwind engine mounted between the wings with the propeller just ahead of the windscreen. It was first produced in 1929.

This airplane was featured as a model/bank by Texaco, #8 in a series "Wings of Texaco", of historic aircraft used by the company.

Surviving aircraft 

 305 "Kruzof" – K-84 on display at the Golden Wings Flying Museum in Minneapolis, Minnesota.
 313 "The Old Patches" – K-84 on display at the Alaska Aviation Museum, in Anchorage, Alaska.

Specifications

References

Bibliography

External links

 Photo of Keystone-Loening K-84
 "With The Sky Police", January 1932, Popular Mechanics article about the New York City Police Air Force and the Keystone-Loening Commuter in service at that time, photos page 26, 29 and 30.
 Keystone-Loening "Commuter", K-84 – U.S. Civil Aircraft

1920s United States civil utility aircraft
Flying boats
Commuter
Commuter
Amphibious aircraft
Biplanes
Single-engined tractor aircraft
Aircraft first flown in 1929